Agios Antonios, also known as Aghios Antonios on signage, is a subway (metro) station of the Athens Metro. It started operating in August 2004.

It took its name from a nearby Christian Orthodox church dedicated to Saint Anthony. This station is in the Peristeri, the biggest municipality of west Athens area. It was the first station in the area and has reduced traffic problems in Peristeri.  In front of the station is Panagi Tsaldari Avenue, one of the important avenues of Peristeri, which links west Athens with Kifissou Avenue (to Piraeus harbor, southern and northern suburbs of city and National Road 1 to Lamia, Larisa, Thessaloniki, generally North Greece and Balkans) and city center. Buses, trolleybuses and taxis pass regularly toward Athens center, Agioi Anargyroi, Ilion, Petroupolis, Chaidari, Egaleo etc. The station of Agios Antonios has two exits, one to the right side of Panagi Tsaldari Ave. and the other to the left side.

References

External links
Official Website

Athens Metro stations
Railway stations opened in 2004
2004 establishments in Greece